The Maddalena lunatic asylum was a famous insane asylum, established in 1813 in Aversa, near Naples, Italy. It was founded by Joachim Murat, and for a time led by the phrenologist Luigi Ferrarese. It was "a celebrated lunatic asylum," both for its size and grandeur and for being "one of the earliest to discard the old system of harsh restraint."

The physical facilities of the asylum were described as follows: It was divided into three distinct parts. The first was a converted former Franciscan convent, and was used to house male patients who were "affected with the different forms of lunacy, uncomplicated, however, with other nervous complaints." A second facility housed patients who, "in addition to mental derangement, were affected with epilepsy," and a third house was for female patients of all manner of diagnosis. Lady Blessington's early nineteenth-century praise for this institution in her "Idler in Italy" has been cited as contradicting Michel Foucault's thesis in Histoire de la Folie.

References

1813 establishments in Italy
Hospitals established in 1813
Defunct hospitals in Italy
Buildings and structures in the Province of Caserta
Former psychiatric hospitals
Joachim Murat